Polycystic ovary syndrome, or PCOS, is the endocrine disorder.

PCOS or variation, may also refer to:

Biology and medicine
 Palliative Care Outcome Scale, a pain scale

Computer operating systems
 PC OS, the operating system for a personal computer
 PC/OS, or Black Lab Linux, a Linux distribution
 Olivetti's PCOS, such as on the Olivetti M20

Other meanings
 Comunitarian Party Option Seven (Spanish: Partido Comunitario Opción Siete), a political party in Colombia
 Precinct count optical scan machine used in vote counting in the Philippines
 Philharmonic Chamber Orchestra Society, now The Philharmonic Orchestra, Singapore

See also

 PC DOS, a variant of the MS-DOS operating system for IBM PCs
 PCO (disambiguation)